Mitrella canariensis is a species of sea snail in the family Columbellidae, the dove snails.

Distribution
This marine species occurs off the Canary Islands.

References

External links
 Orbigny, A. D. d'. (1839-1842). Mollusques, Echinodermes, Foraminifères et Polypiers recueillis aux Iles Canaries par MM. Webb et Berthelot. In: Barker-Webb, P. & Berthelot, S. (eds) Histoire naturelle des Iles Canaries, volume 2(2): 117 pp
 Pallary, P. (1900). Coquilles marines du littoral du département d'Oran. Journal de Conchyliologie. 48(3): 211-422
 Dautzenberg, Ph. (1927). Mollusques provenant des campagnes scientifiques du Prince Albert Ier de Monaco dans l'Océan Atlantique et dans le Golfe de Gascogne. Résultats des Campagnes Scientifiques Accomplies sur son Yacht par Albert Ier Prince Souverain de Monaco. 72: 401 pp., 9 pls
 Gofas, S.; Luque, Á.; Urra, J. (2019). Planktotrophic Columbellidae (Gastropoda) in the northeast Atlantic and the Mediterranean Sea, with description of a new species in the genus Mitrella. Bulletin of Marine Science. 96(1): 145-168

canariensis
Gastropods described in 1840